Francisco Gaviño (born 14 January 1997) is a Spanish equestrian. He competed in the individual eventing at the 2020 Summer Olympics.

References

External links
 

1997 births
Living people
Spanish male equestrians
Olympic equestrians of Spain
Equestrians at the 2020 Summer Olympics
Event riders
Sportspeople from Seville